Bullet train may refer to:

Rail
 Shinkansen high-speed trains of Japan, nicknamed for their appearance and speed
 Other high-speed trains of a similar appearance to Japanese trains
 An ongoing project to build high-speed rail in India.

Rail topics named "Bullet"
 Caribou (train), a passenger train formerly used in Newfoundland and colloquially referred to as The Newfie Bullet
 Bullet, a former passenger train of the Central Railroad of New Jersey
 Bullet (interurban), a high-speed U.S. interurban rail car inaugurated in 1931
 Bathurst Bullet, a passenger train connecting Sydney and Bathurst, Australia
 Bullet TCV, a troop-carrying vehicle developed by Rhodesia

Arts and media
 The Bullet Train (Shinkansen Daibakuha), a 1975 Japanese movie starring Sonny Chiba
 Bullet Train (band), a Japanese boyband
 "Bullet Train" (song), a song by Judas Priest
 Bullet Train (novel), a 2010 novel by Kōtarō Isaka
 Bullet Train (film), a 2022 film based on the novel
 Bullet Train (soundtrack), the 2022 soundtrack made for the film

Other uses
 Bullet Train for Australia, a defunct political party in Australia

See also

 
 Bullet (disambiguation)
 Train (disambiguation)